Meopham railway station is on the Chatham Main Line in England, serving the village of Meopham, Kent. The station is managed by Southeastern.

History
The main line of the London, Chatham and Dover Railway was opened in stages.

The current station building is a prefabricated building erected in 1971 to British Rail's CLASP design.

Facilities and Connections
The station has a ticket office which is open during the morning only (06:15-12:45 Mon-Fri and 08:00-13:15 Sat). At other times, the station is unstaffed and tickets can be purchased from the self-service ticket machine at the station. The station is fitted with modern help points and covered seating is available on both platforms. The station also has toilets which are located on the London bound platform. There is also a chargeable car park located outside the main entrance to the station. There is a taxi rank as well as cycle racks located on the station forecourt. The station has step free access to the London bound platform however access to the Kent bound platform is via the stepped footbridge only so is not accessible.

The station is served Monday-Saturday by the Arriva Southern Counties routes 306 & 308 which provides hourly connections to Sevenoaks, Borough Green, Vigo Village and Gravesend (as well as Bluewater during the evenings).

Services
All services at Meopham are operated by Southeastern using ,  and  EMUs.

The typical off-peak service in trains per hour is:
 1 tph to 
 1 tph to  via 

On Sundays, the service is reduced to hourly in each direction.

References

External links

Gravesham
Railway stations in Kent
Former London, Chatham and Dover Railway stations
Railway stations in Great Britain opened in 1861
Railway stations served by Southeastern
1861 establishments in England